Macaduma feliscaudata is a moth of the subfamily Arctiinae. It was described by David Stephen Fletcher in 1957. It is found on Rennell Island.

References

Macaduma
Moths described in 1957